Bihter Dumanoğlu (born February 3, 1995) is a Turkish female volleyball player. She is currently with the Galatasaray, which competes in the Turkish Women's Volleyball League.

Career

Club
On 21 April 2021, she signed a 2-year contract with the Galatasaray Women's Volleyball Team.

National team
Dumanoğlu is a member of the Turkey women's national volleyball team.

Awards

National team
2014 Women's European Volleyball League -

Club
 2011-12 Turkish Cup -  Runner-up, with Galatasaray Daikin
 2011-12 CEV Cup -  Runner-up, with Galatasaray Daikin

References

External links
Player profile at Volleybox.net

1995 births
Place of birth missing (living people)
Living people
Turkish women's volleyball players
Galatasaray S.K. (women's volleyball) players
Aydın Büyükşehir Belediyespor volleyballers
Beşiktaş volleyballers
Yeşilyurt volleyballers
21st-century Turkish sportswomen